Terceiro Comando Puro is a Brazilian criminal organization in Rio de Janeiro. They split from the Terceiro Comando in 2002.

Group activity is concentrated in the northern and eastern areas, specifically the neighborhood of Senador Camará,

References

Organized crime groups in Brazil
2002 establishments in Brazil